Li Hongzhang, Marquess Suyi (also Li Hung-chang; 15 February 1823 – 7 November 1901) was a Chinese politician, general and diplomat of the late Qing dynasty. He quelled several major rebellions and served in important positions in the Qing imperial court, including the Viceroy of Zhili, Huguang and Liangguang.

Although he was best known in the West for his generally pro-modern stance and importance as a negotiator, Li antagonised the British with his support of Russia as a foil against Japanese expansionism in Manchuria and fell from favour with the Chinese after their defeat in the First Sino-Japanese War. His image in China remains controversial, with criticism on one hand for political and military defeats and praise on the other for his success against the Taiping Rebellion, his diplomatic skills defending Chinese interests in the era of unequal treaties, and his role pioneering China's industrial and military modernisation. He was presented the Royal Victorian Order by Queen Victoria. The French newspaper Le Siècle described him as "the yellow Bismarck."

Names 
Li Hongzhang was also known by other names. His courtesy names were Zifu and Jianfu. His art names were Shaoquan, Yisou and Shengxin. The posthumous name awarded to him by the Qing government was Wenzhong. He was also referred to as Li Zhongtang and Li Fuxiang; "Zhongtang" and "Fuxiang" referred to his honorary appointments as Grand Secretary and Crown Prince's Grand Tutor respectively. He also held the noble peerage First Class Count Suyi and was posthumously honoured as First Class Marquis Suyi.

Biography

Early life and career
In 1843, he sat for the entry-level imperial examination in Lu Prefecture and obtained a yougong (or gongsheng ) position. His father, who was serving as an official in the imperial capital Beijing, was eager to see his son succeed, so he encouraged his son to come to Shuntian Prefecture to take the district-level examination. Li then travelled to Beijing. Along the way, he wrote ten poems under the collection Entering the Capital to express his feelings.

In 1844, Li obtained a juren position in the district-level examination, but failed to make it in the metropolitan-level examination. He then started taking classes under Zeng Guofan. In 1847, he sat for the metropolitan-level examination again and obtained a jinshi position at the young age of 24, and was admitted to the Hanlin Academy as a shujishi. At the same time, he also continued taking classes under Zeng Guofan to improve his knowledge. Three years later, he took the sanguan examination in the academy and earned the position of a bianxiu (an editor).

Suppressing the Taiping Rebellion
In January 1851, the God Worshipping Society led by Hong Xiuquan started the Taiping Rebellion in Guangxi Province. Within about two years, the rebels had conquered many territories in southern China and established the Taiping Heavenly Kingdom with Nanjing as their capital. In 1853, the rebels, advancing from Wuhan, captured Anqing and killed Jiang Wenqing, the xunfu of Anhui Province. The Xianfeng Emperor commissioned Lü Xianji, the Left Vice Secretary of Works, to travel to Anhui Province and recruit civilians to form militias to counter the rebels. Lü Xianji knew that Li was familiar with the local situation in Anhui Province so he secured permission from the imperial court to bring Li along with him as an adviser and assistant. Li was later ordered to remain in Anhui to oversee the militia. In late 1853, the Taiping rebels defeated imperial forces and captured Shucheng County; Lü Xianji committed suicide. In the following year, Jiang Zhongyuan, the xunfu of Anhui Province, committed suicide after Lu Prefecture fell to the rebels. Li then became a subordinate of Fuji, the new xunfu, who ordered him to lead troops to attack the rebels, with Li often leading them in person. Li recaptured two counties and Lu Prefecture from the rebels within the following year. For his achievements, he earned the appointment of a daotai (道台; circuit administrator) and the privilege of wearing a single-eyed peacock feather in his hat. Later, he led troops into the Huai River area, but could not get along with his subordinates and was forced to abandon his mission.

In the winter of 1858, Li was reassigned to serve in Zeng Guofan's office, where he was in charge of drafting documents. Li led a carefree life, flouted rules and regulations, and often woke up late. Zeng Guofan once chided him, "Shaoquan, now that you're working in my office, I only have this piece of advice for you: 'Commitment' is the only thing that matters to us here." Li was shocked and he improved his behaviour after that. In the same year, Weng Tongshu, the xunfu of Anhui, abandoned his post when he came under attack by the Taiping rebels. Zeng Guofan drew from Li's draft when he wrote a memorial to the imperial court to accuse Weng Tongshu of failing in his duty. The lines from Li's draft that were included in Zeng Guofan's actual memorial included: "It is my duty, as Your Majesty's subject, [to point out the failures of my colleague.] I do not dare to let this pass just because of Weng Tonghe's fame and prestige." Although Li earned Zeng Guofan's praise for drafting the memorial, he also caused Weng Tonghe (Weng Tongshu's brother) to bear a grudge against him for what he wrote. While serving under Zeng Guofan, he was put in charge of Yanjianshao Circuit in Fujian Province but did not take up his appointment and remained with Zeng.

In 1860, Li was put in command in the naval forces in Anhui and Jiangsu provinces to counter the Taiping rebels. After Zeng Guofan's Xiang Army recaptured Anqing from the rebels in 1861, Zeng wrote a memorial to the imperial court to praise Li, calling him "a talent with great potential", and sent Li back to Hefei to form a militia. Li managed to recruit enough men to form five battalions in 1862. Zeng Guofan ordered him to bring his troops along with him to Shanghai. Li and his men sailed past rebel-controlled territory along the Yangtze River in British steamboats – the rebels did not attack because Britain was a neutral party – and arrived in Shanghai, where they were commissioned as the Huai Army. Zeng Guofan recommended Li to serve as the xunfu of Jiangsu Province. After gaining ground in Jiangsu, Li focused on enhancing the Huai Army's capabilities, including equipping them with Western firearms and artillery. Within two years, the Huai Army's strength increased from 6,000 to about 60–70,000 men. Li's Huai Army combined forces later with Zeng Guofan's Xiang Army and Charles George Gordon's Ever Victorious Army and prepared to attack the Taiping rebels.

From 1863 to 1864, Li led the Huai Army to attack and recapture Suzhou, Changzhou and other rebel-controlled territories. For his contributions, Li was awarded the honorary appointment Crown Prince's Grand Protector and an imperial yellow jacket. After retaking Changzhou, and capturing and executing the rebel leader Chen Kunshu, Li received a jiduwei peerage in recognition of his achievements. An incident connected with the surrender of Suzhou soured Li's relationship with Gordon. According to an earlier arrangement with Gordon, the rebel leaders agreed to yield Nanjing to imperial forces on the condition that their lives would be spared. However, after the capture of Nanjing, Li ordered the rebel leaders to be executed. This breach of faith infuriated Gordon so much that he grabbed a rifle and wanted to shoot Li, but Li fled. By the end of 1864, the Taiping Rebellion had basically been suppressed by imperial forces. Li was awarded a noble peerage as "First Class Count Suyi" and the privilege of wearing a double-eyed peacock feather in his hat.

As Viceroy of Zhili
After the suppression of the Taiping Rebellion in 1864, Li assumed a civil office as the xunfu of Jiangsu Province for about two years. However, on the outbreak of the Nian Rebellion in Henan and Shandong provinces in 1866, he was ordered to lead troops into battle again. After some misadventures, Li managed to suppress the movement. In recognition of his contributions, he was appointed as Assistant Grand Secretary.

In 1867, Li was appointed as the Viceroy of Huguang, where he remained until 1870, when the Tianjin Massacre necessitated his transfer to Tianjin to handle the diplomatic crisis with the French. He was given the concurrent appointments as Viceroy of Zhili Province and Beiyang Trade Minister to oversee various issues in Zhili, Shandong and Fengtian provinces, including trade, tariffs, diplomacy, coastal defence, and modernisation. He was also conferred the honorary position of "Grand Secretary of Wenhua Hall".

From the time he became Viceroy of Zhili and Beiyang Trade Minister until his death, with a few intervals of retirement, he shaped the Qing Empire's foreign policy to a large extent. In 1876, he signed the Yantai Treaty with Sir Thomas Wade to end a diplomatic crisis with Britain caused by the murder of Augustus Raymond Margary in Yunnan Province. He also arranged treaties with Peru and the Tianjin Convention with Japan, and directed Chinese foreign policy in Korea. Among Li's projects to open China to the world on Chinese terms was support for the Chinese Educational Mission, which sent Chinese boys to the United States for education, starting in 1872. The mission was aborted in 1881.

On the death of the Tongzhi Emperor in 1875, Li introduced a large army into the capital and effected a coup which placed the Guangxu Emperor on the throne under the regency of the Empress Dowagers Ci'an and Cixi. In 1879, Li was awarded the honorary appointment Crown Prince's Grand Tutor.

In 1886, on the conclusion of the Sino-French War, Li arranged a treaty with the French. Li was impressed with the necessity of strengthening the Qing Empire, and while he was Viceroy of Zhili, he raised a large well-drilled and well-armed force, and spent vast sums both in fortifying Port Arthur and the Dagu forts and in strengthening the navy. For years, he had watched the successful reforms effected in Japan and had a well-founded dread of coming into conflict with the Japanese.

Establishing military academies

In 1885, Li founded the Tianjin Military Academy to train Chinese military officers as part of his military reforms. The move was supported by Huai Army commander Zhou Shengchuan. The academy was to serve Huai Army and Green Standard Army officers. Various practical military, mathematics and science subjects were taught at the academy. The instructors were German military officers. Another programme was started at the academy for five years in 1887 to train teenagers as new military officers. Mathematics, practical and technical subjects, sciences, foreign languages, Chinese classics and history were taught at the school. Students also took exams. The Weihaiwei and Shanhaiguan military schools copied the Tianjin Military Academy's curriculum. The maritime defence fund supplied the budget for the Tianjin Military Academy, which was shared with the Tianjin Naval Academy.

First Sino-Japanese War

Because of his prominent role in Chinese diplomacy in Korea and strong political connections in Manchuria, Li found himself directing Chinese forces during the First Sino-Japanese War of 1894–1895. In fact, it was mostly the armies that he established and controlled that did the fighting, whereas other Chinese troops led by his political rivals did not come to their aid. Rampant corruption further weakened the Chinese military. For instance, one official misappropriated ammunition funds for personal use. As a result, shells ran out during battle, forcing one navy captain, Deng Shichang, to resort to ordering his ship to ram an enemy ship. The defeat of Li's modernised armed forces by the Japanese undermined his political standing, as well as the wider cause of the Self-Strengthening Movement.

Li had received the privilege of wearing a three-eyed peacock feather in his hat – a rare exception because three-eyed peacock feathers had previously been restricted to only members of the imperial clan – during Empress Dowager Cixi's 60th birthday celebrations in 1894. However, after the Chinese defeat in the war, Li was disgraced and stripped of his peacock feather. The Qing imperial court initially wanted to send Zhang Yinhuan and Shao Youlian as their representatives to negotiate with the Japanese, but the Japanese rejected them. Li was selected to take on this mission and was given back his peacock feather.

On 24 March 1895, while negotiating with Japan's Prime Minister Itō Hirobumi and Foreign Affairs Minister Mutsu Munemitsu in Shimonoseki, Li was attacked by an assassin, Koyama Toyotarō, who shot him in the left cheek. Koyama was arrested by Japanese police later and he claimed that he desired for the war to continue.

Due to the public embarrassment caused by the attack, the Japanese agreed to the immediate ceasefire Li had urged in the days before, though fighting would continue on Taiwan and in the Penghu Islands. On 17 April 1895, Li signed the Treaty of Shimonoseki with the Japanese, thus ending the First Sino-Japanese War.

Tour of Russia, Europe and North America

In 1896, Li attended the coronation of Nicholas II of the Russian Empire on behalf of the Qing Empire and toured Europe, Canada and the United States, where he advocated reform of the American immigration policies that had greatly restricted Chinese immigration after the Chinese Exclusion Act of 1882 (renewed in 1892).

In a famous interview published by The New York Times on September 3, 1896, Li was asked whether he favored the introduction of the newspaper into China as developed in the U.S. or in Europe. Li's answer was stunningly honest: "There are newspapers in China, but the Chinese editors, unfortunately, do not tell the truth. They do not, as your papers, tell 'the truth, whole truth, and nothing but the truth.' The editors in China are great economizers of the truth; they tell only a part of it. They do not have, therefore, the great circulations that your papers have. Because this economy of the truth, our papers fail in the mission of a great press, to be one of the means of civilization."

While in Britain, he toured parts of the country by train, keeping with his desire to inspire railway development in his own country while constantly fighting against the prejudices of conservative leaders. He visited the industrial area in Barrow, North West England, and toured Lake Windermere on the steamer Tern operated by the Furness Railway Company. He also witnessed the 1896 Royal Naval Fleet Review at Spithead. It was during his visit to Britain in 1896 that Queen Victoria made him a Knight Grand Cross of the Royal Victorian Order.

Boxer Rebellion and death
In 1900, Li once more played a major diplomatic role in negotiating a settlement with the Eight-Nation Alliance forces which had invaded Beijing to put down the Boxer Rebellion. His early position was that the Qing Empire was making a mistake by supporting the Boxers against the foreign powers. During the Siege of the International Legations, Sheng Xuanhuai and other provincial officials suggested that the Qing imperial court give Li full diplomatic power to negotiate with foreign powers. Li telegraphed back to Sheng Xuanhuai on 25 June, describing the declaration of war a "false edict". This tactic gave the "Southeast Mutual Protection" provincial officials a justification not to follow Empress Dowager Cixi's declaration of war. Li refused to accept orders from the government for more troops when they were needed to fight against the foreigners, which he had available. Li controlled the Chinese telegraph service, whose despatches asserted falsely that Chinese forces had exterminated all foreigners in the siege and convinced many foreign readers.

In 1901, Li was the principal Chinese negotiator with the foreign powers which captured Beijing. On 7 September 1901, he signed the Boxer Protocol ending the Boxer Rebellion, and obtained the departure of the Eight-Nation Alliance at the price of huge indemnities for the Chinese. Exhausted from the negotiations, he died from liver inflammation two months later at Xianliang Temple in Beijing. The Guangxu Emperor posthumously honoured Li as Marquis Suyi of the First Class. This peerage was inherited by Li Guojie, who was assassinated in Shanghai on 21February 1939, allegedly as a result of his support for the Nanking Reformed Government.

Family
Li's ancestral family name was actually Xǔ. His ancestors had migrated from Hukou, Jiangxi Province to Hefei, Anhui Province. Li's eighth-great-grandfather, Xu Yingxi, had given up his second son, Xu Shen, for adoption by a relative, Li Xinzhuang. Xu Shen and his descendants had taken Li to be their family name since then. Li's father, Li Wen'an (李文安; 1801–1855), obtained a jinshi degree in the imperial examination in 1838 – the same year as Zeng Guofan. Li Wen'an also served as a langzhong in the Ministry of Justice.

Li had one elder brother and four younger brothers; he was the second son in his family. His elder brother, Li Hanzhang (1821–1899), served as a xunfu and zongdu in a number of provinces. His third brother, Li Hezhang (1825–1880), served as a military officer. His fourth brother was Li Yunzhang, his fifth brother was Li Fengzhang, and his sixth brother was Li Zhaoqing (1835–1873).

Li's first primary spouse, Lady Zhou, bore him a son, Li Jingyu, who died prematurely. Lady Zhou died of illness in 1861.

Li's second primary spouse, Zhao Xiaolian, bore him another son, Li Jingshu. Li Jingshu inherited his father's peerage as Marquis Suyi, but died early. Li Jingshu's son, Li Guojie (1881–1939), inherited the Marquis Suyi peerage and served in a number of official positions in the final years of the Qing dynasty. He became an official and industrialist in the Republic of China later. Li Guojie also married the daughter of Natong (1857–1925), who served in the Grand Secretariat and Grand Council.

Li's secondary spouse, Lady Mo, bore him three sons: Li Jingyuan, Li Jingmai (1876–1938) and Li Jingjin. Among the three, only Li Jingmai survived into adulthood. He served as the Qing Empire's Ambassador to Austria-Hungary and a Right Vice Secretary in the Ministry of Civil Affairs.

Li had three daughters. One of them, Li Ju'ou, married Zhang Peilun (1848–1903) and bore the father of the writer Eileen Chang (1920–1995). The other two daughters married Guo Enhou, the magistrate of Weifang County, and Ren Dehe, the zhushi of Yixing County.

Li also adopted Li Jingfang (1855–1934), a son of his sixth brother Li Zhaoqing. Li Jingfang served as the Qing Empire's Ambassador to Japan and a Left Vice Secretary in the Ministry of Post and Telecommunications.

Li's brother Li Hanzhang had a daughter named Li Peisheng.

His grandson, Li Shiu Tong, would become a sexologist known for his work and relationship with his mentor and romantic partner Magnus Hirschfeld, and would posthumously be recognized as a researcher in his own right following the rediscovery of his manuscripts.

Honours
 Imperial Order of the Double Dragon (China)
 Honorary Knight Grand Cross of the Royal Victorian Order (United Kingdom).
 Grand Cross of the Order of the Red Eagle, in Diamonds (Germany), 14 June 1896

Legacy and assessment

Li left a word as his self-evaluation: "To know me and judge me is a task for the next millennium".

Li was regarded favourably in the United States, owing to his reputation for welcoming foreign influence and his 1896 visit to the country. He was wrongly credited with inventing the American Chinese dish chop suey during the visit. In 1913, William Francis Mannix wrote and published a fabricated Memoirs of Li Hung Chang which received widespread praise before being exposed as a forgery in 1923.

His biographer William J. Hail argued that Li "did perhaps all he could for a land where the conservatism of the people, a reactionary officialdom, and unrestrained international rivalry made each step forward a matter of great difficulty," and praised him as "always progressive, yet patient and conciliatory, it was his fate to bear blame for failures which might have been avoided if he had had his way." The leader of China's New Culture Movement, Hu Shih, was also sympathetic, remarking that if Li had been allowed the opportunity, his achievements for China might have equalled the achievements of his Japanese counterpart, Itō Hirobumi, at the 1895 Treaty of Shimonoseki.

Chinese nationalists criticised Li's relations with the Western powers and Japan. Liang Qichao's 1902 biography of Li blamed him for China's woes and set the tone for further castigation. In Liang's view, Li was the chief culprit for the Self-Strengthening Movement, which these nationalists condemned for collaborating with the European imperialists and suppressing the masses. Liang Qichao's son, Liang Sicheng, denounced Li in 1951 for "selling out" the country. History textbooks in the People's Republic of China labelled Li as a "feudalist" and a traitor to the Chinese people.  It was not until the 1980s that mainland historians began a serious debate of the sort which had been taking place in Taiwan.

Bribery controversy
Sergei Witte dismissed some rumours during Li's visit to Europe that Li was bribed. However, according to the Russian account, Li had urged the Russian government to build a three-million rubles "Li Hongzhang Foundation" to make Li and Zhang Yinheng to support the Sino-Russia railway treaty and Lushun-Dalian Rent Treaty, and a payment of 0.5 million rubles was confirmed. Ma Wenzhong questioned whether the Russian account was reliable.

Works
 Trade Charter Precedents Collection (通商約章成案彙編 1886)

See also 
 Battle of Shanghai (1861)
 Beiyang Army
 Military history of China (pre-1911)
 Self-Strengthening Movement
 Tune of Li Zhongtang

Notes

References

Further reading

 
 
 
 Words on Li Hung Chang from the Papers of Charles Daniel Tenney
 Reminiscences of Li Hung Chang from the Papers of Charles Daniel Tenney

1823 births
1901 deaths
Politicians from Hefei
Chinese people of the Boxer Rebellion
Chinese military personnel of the First Sino-Japanese War
People of the Sino-French War
Political office-holders in Guangdong
Political office-holders in Hubei
Political office-holders in Tianjin
Qing dynasty diplomats
Qing dynasty politicians from Anhui
Honorary Knights Grand Cross of the Royal Victorian Order
Qing dynasty governors of Jiangsu
Xiang Army personnel
Huai Army personnel
Grand Secretaries of the Qing dynasty
Assistant Grand Secretaries
Viceroys of Huguang
Viceroys of Liangguang
Viceroys of Zhili
Viceroys of Liangjiang
Chinese nobility
Beiyang Fleet personnel
Ministers of Zongli Yamen
Chinese reformers